Edward Paul Brynn, (August 1, 1942 Pittsburgh, Pennsylvania -) was a career diplomat, historian and educator.  He was the American ambassador extraordinary and plenipotentiary to Burkina Faso from 1990 to 1993 and to Ghana from 1995 until 1998.

Biography
The son of son of Walter and Mary C. Brynn, he grew up in West Springfield, Massachusetts and Montpelier, Vermont, Brynn graduated from Georgetown University’s School of Foreign Service in 1964.  He  continued his education by getting degrees in British History from Stanford University (M.A. 1965 and Ph.D. 1968) and Trinity College Dublin in Irish Politics (M. Litt. 1968 and Ph. D. 1975). Brynn served in the Air Force, retiring as a Lt. Colonel in 1992. His active duty time include what has been described as “a brief tour in Vietnam (1968-1972)” followed by eighteen years in the active reserve.

On April 17, 1967, he married Jane Ursula Cooke in Garden City, New York.

Career
Brynn entered the Foreign Service in 1972, serving in a variety of posts including Colombo (Junior Political and then Economic Officer 1973-1975); the Air Force Academy (1975-1978) on detail from State; Senate Select Committee on Intelligence (for Senator Patrick Leahy 1981-1982); National War College as Deputy Commandant (1998-1999).

After he retired in July 1999, he was Associate Provost for International Programs at the University of North Carolina at Charlotte until 2005 and from 2005 to 2009 as Professor in the Department of History.  He was an adjunct professor at Georgetown University (1998-1999) and the University of Colorado (1966-1968).  Over the course of his career, Brynn published twelve scholarly articles and two books on eighteenth and nineteenth century British and Irish history.

References

Ambassadors of the United States to Ghana
Ambassadors of the United States to Burkina Faso
People from West Springfield, Massachusetts
People from Montpelier, Vermont
Walsh School of Foreign Service alumni
Stanford University alumni
Alumni of Trinity College Dublin
American historians
United States Air Force personnel of the Vietnam War
United States Air Force Academy faculty
Georgetown University faculty
University of North Carolina at Charlotte faculty
University of Colorado faculty
1942 births
Living people